Edgar Austin Mittelholzer (16 December 1909 – 5 May 1965) was a Guyanese novelist, the earliest novelist from the West Indian region to establish himself in Europe and gain a significant European readership. Mittelholzer, who earned his living almost exclusively by writing fiction, is considered the first professional novelist to come out of the English-speaking Caribbean. His novels include characters and situations from a variety of places within the Caribbean, and range in time from the early period of European settlement to the 20th century. They feature a cross-section of ethnic groups and social classes, dealing with subjects of historical, political, psychological, and moral interest. Mittelholzer is "certainly the most prolific novelist to be produced by the Caribbean". Mittelholzer committed suicide in England in 1965.

Biography

Early life

Born in New Amsterdam, British Guiana (later Guyana), the country's second largest town, Edgar Mittelholzer was the second son of William Austin Mittelholzer, a commercial clerk, and his wife Rosamond Mabel, née Leblanc. Of mixed descent, he had forebears from Switzerland, France, Great Britain and Africa. He was educated at Berbice High School, and at an early age seems to have reacted against his middle-class colonial environment. He worked at various menial jobs while beginning to write and publish his work locally, his first publication being Creole Chips (1937).

The publication of his book Corentyne Thunder signalled the birth of the novel in Guyana. It was written in 1938 when Mittelholzer was aged 29, living and working at odd jobs in New Amsterdam. The manuscript was sent to England and had a perilous existence until finally it found a publisher, Eyre & Spottiswoode, in 1941.

In December 1941, Mittelholzer left Guyana for Trinidad as a recruit in the Trinidad Royal Volunteer Naval Reserve (TRVNR) during the Second World War. He recalled his service in the TRVNR as "one of the blackest and most unpleasant interludes" in his life. Discharged on medical grounds in August 1942, he decided to make Trinidad his home, having married a Trinidadian, Roma Halfhide, in March 1942.

Death

In his last, posthumous novel, the main character escapes his insanity by setting fire to himself. This was to be Mittelholzer’s preferred end: on 5 May 1965, aged 55, the author doused himself with petrol in a field near Farnham, Surrey, and lit a match.

Legacy
The Edgar Mittelholzer Lecture Series was started by A. J. Seymour two years after Mittelholzer's death and then took place sporadically. It is currently delivered annually under the auspices of the Department of Culture. In the words of the Guyana Chronicle: "This memorial lecture series, like the Guyana Prize for Literature, is unique throughout the Caribbean where it is seen as a welcome acknowledgement of the arts, the artist and artistic achievement. Whenever possible, therefore, a distinguished Guyanese is identified and asked to deliver the Mittelholzer Memorial Lecture, which is viewed with distinction and the entire literary community, including scholars and academics, consider it a command appearance."<ref>"Pauline Melville to deliver Mittelholzer Memorial Lecture", Guyana Chronicle Online", 12 November 2012.</ref>

Selected bibliography
 Creole Chips (1937, self-published) 
 Corentyne Thunder (1941; London: Secker & Warburg), Peepal Tree Press, 2009, 
 A Morning at the Office (1950; London: Hogarth Press), Peepal Tree Press, 2010, 
 Shadows Move Among Them (1951; Philadelphia: Lippincott), Peepal Tree Press, 2010, 
 Children of Kaywana (1952; London: Secker & Warburg), 
 The Weather in Middenshot (1952; London: Secker & Warburg)
 The Life and Death of Sylvia (1953), Peepal Tree Press, 2010, 
 Kaywana Stock: The Harrowing of Hubertus (1954; London: Secker & Warburg), 
 The Adding Machine: A Fable for Capitalists and Commercialists (1954; Kingston: Pioneer Press)
 My Bones and My Flute (1955; London: Secker & Warburg), 
 Of Trees and the Sea (1956; London: Secker & Warburg)
 A Tale of Three Places (1957; London: Secker & Warburg)
 Kaywana Blood (1958; London: Secker & Warburg), 
 The Weather Family (1958; London: Secker & Warburg)
 With a Carib Eye (travel) (1958; London: Secker & Warburg, 1965)
 A Tinkling in the Twilight (1959; London: Secker & Warburg)
 Latticed Echoes (1960; London: Secker & Warburg)
 Eltonsbrody (1960; London: Secker & Warburg)
 The Mad MacMullochs (1961; London: Peter Owen)
 Thunder Returning (1961; London: Secker & Warburg)
 The Piling of Clouds (1961; London: Secker & Warburg)
 The Wounded and the Worried (1962; London: Putnam)
 Uncle Paul (1963; London: McDonald)
 A Swarthy Boy: A Childhood in British Guiana – autobiography (1963; London: Putnam)
 The Aloneness of Mrs Chatham (1965; London: Library 33)
 The Jilkington Drama (1965; New York: Abelard-Schuman)

Criticism
 Birbalsingh, F. M., "Edgar Mittelholzer; novelist or pornographer?", in Journal of Commonwealth Literature, no. 7 (July 1969), pp. 80–103.
 Cartey, Wilfred, "The rhythm of society and landscape", in New World Quarterly, Guyana Independence Issue (1966), pp. 97–104.
 Collymore, Frank A., "A Biographical Sketch" in Bim, vol. 10, no. 41 (June/December 1965), pp. 23–6.
 Gilkes, Michael, "The Spirit in the Bottle - a reading of Mittelholzer's A Morning at the Office", in World Literature Written in English vol. 14, no. 1 (April 1965), pp. 237–52.
 Guckian, Patrick, "The Balance of Colour - A reassessment of the work of Edgar Mittelholzer", in Jamaica Journal, vol. 4, no. 1 (March 1970), pp. 38–45.
 Seymour, A. J., "An Introduction to the Novels of Edgar Mittelholzer", in Kyk-Over-Al, vol. 8, no. 24 (December 1958), pp. 60–74.
 Sparer, Joyce L., "Attitudes towards 'Race' in Guyanese Literature", in Caribbean Studies, vol. 8, no. 2 (July 1968), pp. 23–63.

References

External links
 
 Encyclopedia of World Biography on Edgar Mittelholzer
 Andre Bagoo, "The Ghost of Edgar Mittelholzer", Trinidad and Tobago Newsday, 11 May 2008
 "Edgar Mittelholzer - GCA Symposium to Celebrate the Man and His Works", 12 December 2009
 "Remembering Edgar Mittelholzer: Part 1" by Colin Rickards, Stabroek News, 15 November 2010
 "Remembering Edgar Mittelholzer: Part II" by Colin Rickards, Stabroek News'', 29 November 2010
 Jacqueline Ives, "The Idyll and the Warrior", Prose-n-Poetry.

1909 births
1965 deaths
1965 suicides
20th-century Guyanese writers
20th-century male writers
20th-century novelists
Autobiographers
British people of French descent
British people of Swiss descent
Guyanese emigrants to England
Guyanese emigrants to Trinidad and Tobago
Guyanese novelists
Guyanese people of British descent
Guyanese people of French descent
Guyanese people of Swiss descent
Guyanese people of World War II
People from New Amsterdam, Guyana
Suicides by self-immolation
Suicides in Surrey